De Keyser's Royal Hotel was a large hotel on the Victoria Embankment, at its junction with New Bridge Street (now the A201), Blackfriars, London.  The location was formerly the site of Bridewell Palace.

The Royal Hotel was founded before 1845 by Constant de Keyser, an immigrant to England from Belgium.  It was a high-end hotel, catering mainly to visitors from continental Europe. His son Polydore de Keyser ran the hotel from around 1856.

A new hotel building with five storeys and two basements was opened at the same site on 5 September 1874, designed by the Scottish architect Edward Augustus Gruning.  The foundation stone was laid by the daughter of the Belgian Vice-Counsul.  The new building had a long curved façade facing the River Thames, close to Sion College and near the site of the new City of London School building that opened in 1883.  The exterior was in an Anglicised form of the Second Empire Style, faced by white Suffolk bricks and Portland stone, with a Mansard roof covered with green slates and hips, ridges and dormers in zinc.  An archway to through to an internal courtyard, at the centre of which was a glass dome covering a billiard room below, later used as a lounge. The interior was decorated in opulent French style, with 230 guest rooms and many function rooms, including a dining hall  with space for 400 people. Furniture was imported from Paris.

A second wing opened in 1882, when the hotel became the largest in London, accommodating up to 480 guests, with a second dining room for another 250 people, and rooms for 150 staff.

Sir Polydore de Keyser had no children.  His hotel was sold to a limited company in 1897, and a nephew Polydor Welchand de Keyser took over the management.

The hotel suffered a serious decline of business after the outbreak of the First World War, and it was taken over by a receiver.   With a shortage of office space in London for the wartime ministries, the hotel was requisitioned in May 1916 by the Office of Works for the wartime use of the Royal Flying Corps.  Renamed "Adastral House", the first building to bear that name, it was the London headquarters of the Royal Flying Corps until it moved to Hotel Cecil on the formation of the new Air Ministry and the Royal Air Force in 1918.  For a short period it was occupied by the Royal Army Medical Corps, until 1919.

The owner of the hotel claimed compensation, leading to a legal case on the power of the royal prerogative, Attorney-General v De Keyser's Royal Hotel Limited.  The case reached the House of Lords, which held that the Defence of the Realm Act 1914 replaced the royal prerogative, and that compensation was due under the Defence Act 1842.

The hotel never reopened.  The building was sold to Lever Brothers in 1921, and it became their London headquarters.  The hotel building was demolished in 1931 to make way for the construction of Unilever House.

References
 Anita McConnell, ‘Keyser, Sir Polydor de (1832–1898)’, Oxford Dictionary of National Biography, Oxford University Press, 2004  accessed 8 Dec 2016
 Private Property, Government Requisition and the Constitution, 1914-1927, G. R. Rubin, p. 71-91
 Unilever House, De Keyser’s Royal Hotel and the Drinking Fountain Association, A London Inheritance, 28 September 2014
 The British Architect, 9 October 1874, p. 235-236
 HC Deb 12 August 1919 vol 119 c1114W

Defunct hotels in London
Demolished hotels in the United Kingdom
Buildings and structures demolished in 1931
Demolished buildings and structures in London